Albert Schinz (1870 – December 19, 1943) was an American French and philosophical scholar, editor, and professor of French literature. Although he was born in Neuchâtel, Switzerland, Schinz died in the United States at an Iowa State University Hospital, in Iowa City, of pneumonia.

Education and career
Albert graduated from the University of Neuchâtel (1888–1892), and studied at Berlin, Tübingen (Ph.D., 1894), Sorbonne and Collège de France (1894), and in the United States at Clark University.  He taught at the University of Minnesota for one year, then became professor of French literature at Clark University (1897–1898), University of Minnesota (1898–1899), Bryn Mawr College (1899- ), and at Smith College in Northampton, Massachusetts  (1913–1928). He finally retired after teaching French at the University of Pennsylvania in 1941. He spent the rest of his time as a visiting professor at Indiana, Texas, and Iowa University. He was a guest editor for an issue of the Modern Language Journal.

Beliefs

Anti-pragmatism

Works

Books
 Anti-Pragmatism: An Examination into the Respective Rights of Intellectual Aristocracy and Social Democracy (1909)
 J. J. Rousseau: A Forerunner of Pragmatism (1909) 
 Les accent dans l'ecriture française (1912) 
 La question du "Contrat Social" (1913) 
 French Literature of the Great War (1920)
Seventeenth century French readings (1915) 
Eighteenth century French readings 
Nineteenth century French readings

Articles and Journals
"L'art dans les Contes devots de Gautier de Coinci" 

Schinz was published in The Nation as a contributor of an article in 1918, Issue 107  and was critically reviewed in an article for his book French Literature of the Great War.

His book J. J. Rousseau: A Forerunner of Pragmatism was also reviewed in the Modern Language Quarterly.

See also 
Pragmatism
J. J. Rousseau
the Great War

References

External links 
 
 

1870 births
1943 deaths
American book editors
American political writers
American male non-fiction writers
Clark University alumni
University of Neuchâtel alumni